Quebec Route 136 may refer to:
Quebec Route 136 (Montreal)
Quebec Route 136 (Quebec City)